John Kenneth Edward Slack DL (23 December 1930 – 6 May 2012) was an English cricketer and judge. He was born at Marylebone, London.

A right-handed batsman, Slack made his first-class debut for Cambridge University against Middlesex in 1954. He played 6 further first-class matches for the university in that year, the last coming against Oxford University. In his 7 first-class matches, he scored 434 runs at a batting average of 31.00, with two half centuries and a single century high score of 135. This came on debut against Middlesex.

Slack later joined Buckinghamshire, making his debut for the county in the 1964 Minor Counties Championship against Suffolk. Slack played Minor counties cricket for Buckinghamshire from 1964 to 1969, which included 40 Minor Counties Championship matches. He made his only List A appearance for Buckinghamshire against Middlesex in the 1969 Gillette Cup, captaining the team. He scored 8 runs before being dismissed by Fred Titmus.

Outside of cricket he played rugby for Middlesex. 

By profession Slack was a solicitor, working for many years in London. He was appointed as a circuit judge in 1974, a position held for the next 26 years, during which he presided over Aylesbury Crown Court for many years. He was later appointed a Deputy Lieutenant for Buckinghamshire on 10 November 1995.

He died at Cuddington, Buckinghamshire, on 6 May 2012, having suffered a stroke two days previously.

References

External links
John Slack at ESPNcricinfo
John Slack at CricketArchive

1930 births
2012 deaths
People from Marylebone
People educated at University College School
Alumni of St John's College, Cambridge
English cricketers
Buckinghamshire cricketers
Buckinghamshire cricket captains
Cambridge University cricketers
English solicitors
20th-century English judges
Deputy Lieutenants of Buckinghamshire
Lawyers from Buckinghamshire